Dorothy's slender opossum (Marmosops dorothea) is a species of opossum in the family Didelphidae. It is found in Brazil and Bolivia. It is threatened by habitat loss.

Recent research suggests that M. dorothea is a synonym of M. noctivagus, the white-bellied slender opossum. On the other hand, M. ocellatus, a junior synonym of M. dorothea, may be a separate true species.

References

Opossums
Mammals of Bolivia
Mammals described in 1911
Taxa named by Oldfield Thomas
Taxonomy articles created by Polbot
Taxobox binomials not recognized by IUCN